Scratch the Upsetter Again is a studio album by The Upsetters, released in 1970.

Track listing

Side one
"Bad Tooth"
"The Dentis"
"Outer Space"
"One Punch"
"Will You Still Love Me" – Dave Barker
"Take One"

Side two
"Soul Walk"
"I Want to Thank You"
"Mule Train" – Count Prince Miller
"Touch of Fire"
"She Is Gone Again" – Alva Lewis
"The Result"

The Upsetters albums
1970 albums
Albums produced by Lee "Scratch" Perry
Trojan Records albums